The Ethiopia-Yemen Continental Flood Basalts were erupted during the Oligocene. They cover an area of about 600,000 km2 in Yemen and Ethiopia, with an estimated volume of greater than 350,000 km3. They are associated with the Afar Plume and the initiation of rifting in the southern Red Sea and Gulf of Aden.

In Ethiopia flood basalts cover an old erosion surface with occasional flat areas or peneplains. Burial of old surfaces by lava has preserved laterite soils in both Yemen and Ethiopia.

Composition
The lavas of the Ethiopia-Yemen CFB show systematic variations in composition both vertically and laterally. Most of the lavas are basalts, but those closest to the Afar Triangle being very high titanium transitional basalts and picrites, passing outwards into high-Ti tholeiitic basalts and finally into low-Ti tholeiitic basalts. The sequence is also an example of bimodal volcanism and the uppermost part typically contains significant amounts of rhyolitic lavas.

References

Large igneous provinces
Geology of Ethiopia
Geology of Yemen
Flood basalts
Oligocene volcanism